Going Places is an album by experimental music band Yellow Swans, released on March 2, 2010, by Type Records. It is the final album by the band, recorded and released after the band's 2008 breakup.

Recording
According to the band member Gabriel Mindel Saloman, Yellow Swans felt exhausted after constant touring and the tour-record-tour cycle. To avoid conflicts and stay friends the band decided to break up. The members made a list of things they need to do beforehand, of which making the final album ended up being a top priority. They spent a year working on it, recording it in live single takes in the basement of the Rotture club in Portland, Oregon. "We were more in the zone during these sessions than we’d ever been", says Saloman.

Critical reception

Going Places received positive reviews from music critics. At Metacritic, which assigns a normalized rating out of 100 to reviews from mainstream publications, the album received an average score of 81, based on 7 reviews.

Ned Raggett of AllMusic described the music on the album as "the contrast [...] of scraggly aural squalor and a looming sense of near-romantic melancholy". Pitchfork contributor Marc Masters thought the album "transforms a sense of finality and reflection into often incredible instrumental passages" and that it "gives you space to discover tons of themes and ideas without limiting you to specific ones". Dave Heaton of PopMatters praised the band's creativity, saying that the band did "an especially good job here of making pretty and even tuneful songs that still have that tear-your-face-off quality". Eric Dawson of Tiny Mix Tapes named Going Places as one of the band's best albums, noting that "the duo [is] weaving sounds in and around each other".

Track listing

Personnel
Credits are adapted from the album's liner notes.

 Gabriel Mindel Saloman – guitar, tapes, electronics
 Pete Swanson – electronics, tapes, vocals
 Timothy Stollenwerk – mastering
 Jefre Cantu-Ledesma – artwork

References

External links
 

2010 albums
Noise music albums by American artists
Drone music albums by American artists
Experimental music albums by American artists